Xenia of Tarusa ( – 1312), also known as Kseniya Yurievna, was a Princess consort of Tver and Grand Princess consort of Vladimir from 1267 to 1271. She is counted among the saints of the Russian Orthodox Church.

Xenia of Tarusa was a daughter of Youri Mikhailovich, Prince of Tarusa. 

She married Yaroslav III (Yaroslav Yaroslavich), Prince of Tver and Grand Prince of Vladimir in 1265. During her marriage and the reign of her husband she was unusually influential in the affairs of the state and remained so even after Yaroslav's death in 1271. Soon after she retired to the women's monastery in Novgorod, yet continued to play an influential role in the affairs of the principality. She died in 1312 as a nun and was buried in the  she founded.

Canonization 
Soon after her death she was canonized locally, and again in 1988.

She is revered in the Diocese of Tver: Her memorial day is on the first Sunday after June 29.

References 
 Насколько я понял, вы и сейчас часто бываете в Тарусе. Можете рассказать о нынешней жизни в городе? 
 Janet Martin Medieval Russia 980-1584 (Cambridge: Cambridge University Press, 1995)
 Brief Information on Locally Honored Saints (Tver, 1991)
  
 

Princes of Tver
1240s births
1312 deaths
Year of birth uncertain
Russian saints of the Eastern Orthodox Church
Russian princesses by marriage
13th-century Russian princesses
14th-century Russian princesses
14th-century Eastern Orthodox Christians
14th-century Christian saints
Christian female saints of the Middle Ages
13th-century Russian people
14th-century Russian people
Rurik dynasty